Fosterella rojasii is a plant species in the genus Fosterella. This species is native to Bolivia and Paraguay.

References

rojasii
Flora of Bolivia
Flora of Paraguay
Plants described in 1940